Frozen is a 2005 British psychological thriller  film directed by Juliet McKoen. It features Shirley Henderson, Roshan Seth and Ger Ryan. Set in Fleetwood, on the Fylde coast, in North West England, it was filmed in and around the town and also on location in Scotland and Sweden. It is a tale that has the viewer undecided whether it is a ghost story or a murder mystery right until the final climactic moments.

Plot
The film is set two years after the disappearance of Kath Swarbrick's older sister, Annie. Kath is haunted by Annie's disappearance and continues to investigate herself. On the discovery of some strange CCTV footage she appears to lose her grip on reality. Friends and colleagues are concerned for her sanity and beg her to stop.

She is spurred on when she discovers that she has recurring visions of Annie in an otherworldly landscape, which is actually the estuary of the River Wyre in Morecambe Bay, after visiting the last known location of her sister. She begins to wonder if this is a clue, a warning, or a glimpse into the afterlife.

Cast
Shirley Henderson as Kath Swarbrick
Roshan Seth as Noyen Roy
Ger Ryan as Elsie
Richard Armitage as Steven
Sean Harris as Hurricane Frank
Ralf Little as Eddie
Lyndsey Marshal as Tracey
Jamie Sives as Jim
Shireen Shah as Vellma
Rebecca Palmer as Irene
Heather Waters as Annie
Karl Johnson as Coastguard Bill
George Costigan as PC Pike
Erin Byrne as baby Josh

Awards and nominations
Frozen won the Best Feature Film at the Dubrovnik Film Festival, the BBC Audience Award at the 2005 Commonwealth Film Festival, and was nominated to the BAFTA Scotland Award for the Audience Award. Shirley Henderson's performance earned her the BAFTA Scotland Award for Best Actress in a Scottish Film, as well as Best Actress category in the 2005 Marrakech International Film Festival and the 2006 Cherbourg-Octeville Festival of Irish & British Film, and also a Special Mention at the Créteil International Women's Film Festival.

References

External links
 

2005 films
English-language Scottish films
Scottish films
Films shot in Edinburgh
2000s English-language films